Abdulaziz Usman  Tarabu (born 1 January 1962) is a Nigerian senator who represents the People's Democratic Party (PDP) in Jigawa State. He became a member of the Nigerian Senate in 2007.

Background

Abdulaziz Usman has a post-graduate degree in Business Management.  Before entering politics, he was a senior planning officer for Jigawa State Agriculture And Rural Development. He was elected as a member of the House Of Representatives for 1999–2003, and was reelected for 2003–2007.

In 2005, he supported Atiku Abubakar, then the Vice President of Nigeria, in a libel claim against Newswatch magazine related to accusations of corruption while Atiku was chairman of the National Council on Privatization.

Senate career

Abdulaziz Usman was elected to the National Senate for the Jigawa North East constituency in 2007.
A May 2009 report by This Day said he had not sponsored any bill, although he co-sponsored some motions and sometimes contributed to debates in plenary. He was chairman of the Inter-Parliamentary Affairs Committee.
In the April 2011 elections he was reelected as Senator for Jigawa North-East on the PDP platform, with 135,202 votes.

References

Living people
Jigawa State
1962 births
Peoples Democratic Party members of the Senate (Nigeria)
Members of the House of Representatives (Nigeria)
21st-century Nigerian politicians